The discography of Japanese pop and jazz vocalist Juju consists of six studio albums, four tribute albums, two extended plays, two live albums, five video albums and numerous singles. Juju debuted as a singer in 2001, collaborating with artists such as DJ Masterkey, Spontania (then known as Hi-Timez) and worked on the soundtrack for the film Kyōki no Sakura.

In 2004 while still based in New York, Juju released her debut single with Sony Music Entertainment Japan, "Hikari no Naka e". She had her first successful single in 2006 with the song "Kiseki o Nozomu Nara...", however reached widespread fame in 2008 when "Kimi no Subete ni", the song of her long-time collaborators, Spontania, became a hit single, managing to be certified Million by the RIAJ. This was followed by the successful tracks "Sunao ni Naretara" (2008), an answer song to ""Kimi no Subete ni", and "Ashita ga Kuru Nara" (2009), a duet with R&B singer Jay'ed used as the theme song for the film April Bride (2009).

In 2010, Juju released Request, a tribute album featuring covers of songs by Japanese female vocalists. Led by a cover of My Little Lover's "Hello, Again (Mukashi Kara Aru Basho)", the album was certified double platinum and became Juju's most successful album in her career. In 2014 to celebrate the 10th year since her debut with Sony, she released a follow-up album to this, Request II.

In 2011 and 2013, Juju released albums compiling her renditions of jazz standards, Delicious and Delicious: Juju's Jazz 2nd Dish. In 2012, Juju released an MTV Unplugged album, featuring a live concert recorded in New York. In 2013, Juju recorded Gift, a live concert album collaborating with the Japan Philharmonic Orchestra.

Studio albums

Cover albums

Extended plays

Compilation albums

Live albums

Singles

As a lead artist

As a featured artist

Promotional singles

Other charted songs

Other appearances

Video albums

Notes

References

Discographies of Japanese artists
Vocal jazz discographies
Pop music discographies
Rhythm and blues discographies